Tom Georgeson (born 8 August 1937) is an English actor, known for his television and film work. His most notable credits have been supporting parts in Between the Lines (1992–94) and in three dramas by Alan Bleasdale: Boys from the Blackstuff (1982), Scully (1984), and G.B.H. (1991). He appeared as the lawyer's clerk Clamb in the BBC One serial Bleak House (2005).

Other television work has included roles in police and hospital dramas such as Holby City, Juliet Bravo, The Manageress, Peak Practice, Agatha Christie's Poirot, A Touch of Frost, Cadfael, The Bill, Dalziel and Pascoe, The Professionals and Z-Cars. He has also appeared twice in Doctor Who (in the stories Genesis of the Daleks and Logopolis) and in Ashes to Ashes, Foyle's War, Brookside and The Crimson Petal and the White.

Georgeson's film credits include A Fish Called Wanda (1988), where his character's name was a play on his own ('George Thomason'), and the follow-up film Fierce Creatures (1997) as a spectator at the sea-lion centre. Georgeson is also well known for his stage work and was nominated for a 2002 London Evening Standard Theatre Award for Best Actor for his performance in Frozen at the Cottesloe Theatre (RNT).

Selected TV and filmography

 Armchair Theatre (Go On... It'll Do You Good, 1969; and Death of Glory, 1973)
 Z-Cars ("Pursuit", 1974; and "Pleasure", 1978)
 ITV Playhouse (The Proofing Session, 1977; and Going Back, 1979)
 Play for Today (The Country Party, 1977; and The After Dinner Joke, 1978)
 Doctor Who (Genesis of the Daleks, 1975; and Logopolis, 1981)
 The Professionals (episodes: "Need to Know", 1978; and "In the Public Interest", 1980)
 The Black Stuff (1980)
 When the Boat Comes In ("Back to Dear Old Blighty", 1981)
 Boys from the Blackstuff (1982)
 Juliet Bravo (Ten Episodes) (1983)
 Scully (1984)
 No Surrender (1985)
 A Fish Called Wanda (1988)
 The Manageress (1989–91)
 G.B.H. (1991)
 Between the Lines (1992–94)
 The Treasure Seekers (1996)
 Fierce Creatures (1997)
 Cadfael (The Raven in the Foregate, 1998)
 The Land Girls (1998)
 Hetty Wainthropp Investigates (Series 4, Episode 2 - "Family Values"; 1998)
 Liverpool 1(1998)
 Swing (1999)
 Silent Witness ("A Kind of Justice", 1999)
 A Touch of Frost ("One Man's Meat", 1999)
 Ultimate Force ("The Killing House", 2002)
 Clocking Off (Series 4, Episode 5; 2003)
 Foyle's War ("Fifty Ships", 2003)
 Man Dancin' (2003)
 Agatha Christie's Poirot (The Hollow, 2004)
 Waking the Dead ("False Flag", 2004)
 Bleak House ("Clamb", 2005)
 Under the Greenwood Tree (2005)
 Heartbeat ("Auld Acquaintances", 2005)
 Midsomer Murders ("Dead Letters", 2006)
 Irish Jam (2006)
 The Inspector Lynley Mysteries ("One Guilty Deed", 2006)
 Notes on a Scandal (2006)
 Angel (2007)
 Hancock and Joan (2008)
 The Royal (2009)
 Ashes to Ashes (Series 2, Episode 6; 2009)
 Shameless (Series 7 Episode 12; 2010)
 Justice (five episodes, 2011)
 The Crimson Petal and the White (2011)
 The Suspicions of Mr Whicher (2011)
 Henry IV, Parts I and II (2012)
 Frankie (2013)
 New Tricks (2014)

External links

1937 births
Living people
English male film actors
English male stage actors
English male television actors
Male actors from Liverpool